Brandenburg United Methodist Church (formerly Brandenburg United Methodist Episcopal Church) is a historic church at 215 Broadway in Brandenburg, Kentucky.  It was built in 1855 and added to the National Register of Historic Places in 1984.

The church received a rear addition in 1893.

References

United Methodist churches in Kentucky
Churches on the National Register of Historic Places in Kentucky
Churches completed in 1855
19th-century Methodist church buildings in the United States
National Register of Historic Places in Meade County, Kentucky
1855 establishments in Kentucky